Despotism (despotismós) is a form of government in which a single entity rules with absolute power.  Normally, that entity is an individual, the despot; but (as in an autocracy) societies which limit respect and power to specific groups have also been called despotic.

Colloquially, the word despot applies pejoratively to those who use their power and authority to oppress their populace, subjects, or subordinates. More specifically, the term often applies to a head of state or government. In this sense, it is similar to the pejorative connotations that are associated with the terms tyrant and dictator.

Etymology 
The root despot comes from the Greek word despotes, which means "one with power." The term has been used to describe many rulers and governments throughout history. It connoted the absolute authority and power exercised by the Pharaohs of Ancient Egypt, signified nobility in Byzantine courts, designated the rulers of Byzantine vassal states, and acted as a title for  Byzantine Emperors. In this and other Greek or Greek influenced contexts, the term was used as an honorific rather than as a pejorative.

Due to its reflexive connotation throughout history, the word despot cannot be objectively defined. While despot is closely related to other Greek words like basileus and autokrator, these connotations have also been used to describe a variety of rulers and governments throughout history, such as local chieftains, simple rulers, kings, and emperors.

Philosophy

Ancient Greek 
Of all the ancient Greeks, Aristotle was perhaps the most influential promoter of the concept of oriental despotism. He passed this ideology to his student, Alexander the Great, who conquered the Achaemenid Empire, which at the time was ruled by the despotic Darius III, the last king of the Achaemenid dynasty. Aristotle asserted that oriental despotism was not based on force, but on consent. Hence, fear could not be said to be its motivating force, but rather the servile nature of those enslaved, which would feed upon the power of the despot master. 

Within ancient Greek society, every Greek man was free and capable of holding office; both able to rule and be ruled. In contrast, among the barbarians, all were slaves by nature. Another difference Aristotle espoused was based on climates. He observed that the peoples of cold countries, especially those of Europe, were full of spirit but deficient in skill and intelligence, and that the peoples of Asia, although endowed with skill and intelligence, were deficient in spirit and hence were subjected to slavery. Possessing both spirit and intelligence, the Greeks were free to govern all other peoples.
 
For the historian Herodotus, it was the way of the Orient to be ruled by autocrats and, even though Oriental, the character faults of despots were no more pronounced than the ordinary man's, though given to much greater opportunity for indulgence. The story of Croesus of Lydia exemplifies this. Leading up to Alexander's expansion into Asia, most Greeks were repelled by the Oriental notion of a sun-king, and the divine law that Oriental societies accepted. Herodotus's version of history advocated a society where men became free when they consented lawfully to the social contract of their respective city-state.

Montesquieu  

The concept of despotism, and especially Oriental despotism, entered European political thought with Montesquieu's The Spirit of the Laws in the 18th century. The idea was not new or unique to Montesquieu's work, but Montesquieu's work is widely regarded as having been the most influential on modern political thought.

History 

In its classical form, despotism is a state in which a single individual (the despot) holds all the power and authority embodying the state, and everyone else is a subsidiary person.  This form of despotism was common in the first forms of statehood and civilization; the Pharaoh of Egypt is an exemplary figure of the classical despot.

Edward Gibbon suggested that the increasing use of Oriental-style despotism by the Roman emperors was a major factor in the fall of the Roman Empire, particularly from the reign of Elagabalus: As the attention of the new emperor was diverted by the most trifling amusements, he wasted many months in his luxurious progress from Syria to Italy, passed at Nicomedia his first winter after his victory, and deferred till the ensuing summer his triumphal entry into the capital. A faithful picture, however, which preceded his arrival, and was placed by his immediate order over the altar of Victory in the senate-house, conveyed to the Romans the just but unworthy resemblance of his person and manners. He was drawn in his sacerdotal robes of silk and gold, after the loose flowing fashion of the Medes and Phoenicians; his head was covered with a lofty tiara, his numerous collars and bracelets were adorned with gems of an inestimable value. His eyebrows were tinged with black, and his cheeks painted with an artificial red and white. The grave senators confessed with a sigh, that, after having long experienced the stern tyranny of their own countrymen, Rome was at length humbled beneath the effeminate luxury of Oriental despotism. (The Decline and Fall of the Roman Empire, Book One, Chapter Six)

The enemies of Swedish king Gustav Vasa considered him a despot. The word itself seems to have been coined by the opponents of Louis XIV of France in the 1690s, who applied the term despotisme to describe their monarch's somewhat free exercise of power. The word is ultimately Greek in origin, and in ancient Greek usage, a despot (despótès) was technically a master who ruled in a household over those who were slaves or servants by nature.

The term now implies tyrannical rule. Despotism can refer to any absolutist or dictatorial regime or leader that uses their power in a cruel manner.

However, in enlightened absolutism (also known as benevolent despotism), which came to prominence in 18th century Europe, absolute monarchs used their authority to institute a number of reforms in the political systems and societies of their countries. This movement was quite probably triggered by the ideas of the Age of Enlightenment.

The Enlightenment philosopher Montesquieu believed that despotism was an appropriate government for large states. Likewise, he believed that republics were suitable for small states and that monarchies were ideal for moderate-sized states.

Although the word has a pejorative meaning nowadays, it was once a legitimate title of office in the Byzantine Empire. Just as the word Byzantine is often used in a pejorative way, so the word despot now has equally negative connotations. In fact, Despot was an Imperial title, first used under Manuel I Komnenos (1143–1180) who created it for his appointed heir Alexius-Béla. According to Gyula Moravcsik, this title was a simple translation of Béla's Hungarian title úr, but other historians believe it comes from the ancient Greek despotes (literally, the master). In the Orthodox Liturgy, if celebrated in Greek, the priest is addressed by the deacon as Despot even today.

It was typically bestowed on sons-in-law and later sons of the Emperor and, beginning in the 13th century, it was bestowed to foreign princes. The Despot wore elaborate costumes similar to the Emperor's and had many privileges. Despots ruled over parts of the empire called Despotates.

The United States Declaration of Independence accused King George III of "a long train of abuses and usurpations, pursuing invariably the same Object, evinc[ing] a design to reduce [the people] under absolute Despotism".

Contrast with absolute monarchy 
According to Montesquieu, the difference between absolute monarchy and despotism is that in the case of the monarchy, a single person governs with absolute power by fixed and established laws, whereas a despot governs by his or her own will and caprice.

See also 
 Autocracy
 Authoritarianism
 Absolute monarchy
 Dictatorship
 Despot (court title)

References

External links 

 

Authoritarianism
Dictatorship
History of Asia
Marxist theory
Monarchy
Political systems
Oligarchy